The Fuccons is a Japanese sketch comedy series produced by Yoshimasa Ishibashi centered on the family of the same name, consisting of American expatriates James and Barbara Fuccon with their son, Mikey, who are played by mannequins. The series originated as a recurring segment in Ishibashi's sketch comedy show, Vermilion Pleasure Night, under the title The Fuccon Family, which aired on TV Tokyo. The segments were followed up with The Fuccon Family Part 2 and New Fuccon Family.

A film titled The Color of Life compiling skits from Vermilion Pleasure Night was released in 2001, which also contained alternate cuts and endings to The Fuccon Family. A DVD compiling The Fuccon Family was later released on January 24, 2004.

Beginning on January 6, 2002, the series received its own late night time slot and retitled Oh! Mikey. It ran for a total of eight seasons until 2005. Afterwards, several sketches that never made it to television broadcast were released direct-to-DVD, beginning with Oh! Mikey Hard Core in 2005.

In 2004, the episodes "A Family Crisis", "The Lady Tutor", and "Mikey's Grandparents" were dubbed in English for the 54th Berlin International Film Festival, which were later released with the limited version of Oh! Mikey Hard Core. In the same year, along with Vermilion Pleasure Night, ADV Films licensed the first four seasons for North American distribution with a new English dub produced, releasing the series under the title The Fuccons. The English dub was broadcast on Anime Network, as well as a recurring segment on G4's Late Night Peepshow on G4.

ADV Films released the first 8 episodes as The Fuccons Vol. 0: Meet the Fuccons on December 20, 2005. 17 episodes were later released as The Fuccons Vol. 1: OH! Mikey on February 28, 2006. 18 episodes were released as The Fuccons Vol. 2: It's a Fuccon World! on April 25, 2006. 17 episodes were released as The Fuccons Vol. 3: Fuccon! Fuccon! Fuccon! on July 11, 2006. A compilation of vols. 1-3 were released as The Fuccons: The Whole Fuccon Show! on December 9, 2008.

Series overview

Episodes

Vermilion Pleasure Night sketches

 is a recurring segment in the 2000 sketch comedy show Vermilion Pleasure Night. A DVD compiling The Fuccon Family was later released on January 24, 2004. In North America, the sketches were made available in English after ADV Films licensed Vermilion Pleasure Night, releasing the first volume in 2006.

The Fuccon Family (2000)

{{Episode table|overall= | series= | title= | titleR={{efn|name=fucconfamily title|All English episode titles were taken from Vermilion Pleasure Night'''s official website and ADV Films.}} | director= | writer= | airdate= | country=Japan| episodes=

}}

The Fuccon Family Part 2 (2000)

New Fuccon Family (2000)

Season 1 (2002)

The first season, titled Oh! Mikey 1st in Japan, was broadcast from January 6, 2002, to March 31, 2002, on TV Tokyo for 13 episodes. It was later released on DVD on December 11, 2002, by Avex Trax. In North America, a Region 1 DVD with seasons 1 and 2 was released on February 28, 2006, under the title The Fuccons Vol. 1: Oh! Mikey.

Season 2 (2002)

The second season, titled Oh! Mikey 2nd in Japan, was broadcast from April 2, 2002, to June 25, 2002, on TV Tokyo for 13 episodes. In North America, a Region 1 DVD with seasons 1 and 2 was released on February 28, 2006, under the title The Fuccons Vol. 1: Oh! Mikey.

Season 3 (2002)

The third season, titled Oh! Mikey 3rd in Japan, was broadcast from July 2, 2002, to September 24, 2002, on TV Tokyo for 13 episodes.

Season 4 (2002)

The fourth season, titled Oh! Mikey 4th in Japan, was broadcast from October 1, 2002, to December 24, 2002, on TV Tokyo for 13 episodes. It was later released on DVD on July 19, 2003.

Season 5 (2003)

The fifth season, titled Oh! Mikey 5th in Japan, was broadcast beginning July 5, 2003 to September 27, 2003, on TV Tokyo for 13 episodes. It was later released on DVD on July 7, 2004.

Season 6 (2004)

The sixth season, titled Oh! Mikey 6th in Japan, was broadcast beginning April 3, 2004 to June 26, 2004, on TV Tokyo, TV Setouchi, TV Aichi, TV Osaka, TV Hokkaido, and TVQ Kyushu for 13 episodes. A DVD compiling the episodes was released on December 3, 2004.

Season 7 (2005)

The seventh season, titled Oh! Mikey 7th in Japan, was broadcast from January 13, 2005, to April 6, 2005, on TV Tokyo for 13 episodes. It was later released on DVD on April 29, 2005.

Season 8 (2005)

The eighth season, titled Oh! Mikey 8th in Japan, was broadcast from April 11, 2005, to July 11, 2005, on TV Tokyo for 12 episodes. It was later released on DVD on December 3, 2005.

Hard Core (2005)Oh! Mikey Hard Core was released direct-to-DVD on August 26, 2005.

Extra (2006)Oh! Mikey Extra was released direct-to-DVD on August 25, 2006.

Fever (2007)

A film titled Oh! Mikey Fever premiered through a limited theater screening in Tokyo and Osaka on December 1, 2007. It was later released on DVD on February 22, 2008.

Romance (2010)Oh! Mikey Romance'' was released direct-to-DVD on December 3, 2010, to celebrate the series' 10th anniversary.

Notes

References

Fuccons, The
Lists of Japanese television series episodes